Stenomelania denisoniensis is a very variable species of freshwater snail, an aquatic gastropod mollusk in the family Thiaridae. Stenomelania denisoniensis has a long, slender shell and small aperture. This species has a characteristic angled shoulder just below the suture. This shoulder may be strong in some individuals and weak in others even if they are part of the same population.

Biology and ecology 
"On and in sediment, rocks and on water weeds in freshwater rivers, streams, lakes and dams. A detritus and algal feeder. Stenomelania denisoniensis broods larvae in a brood pouch in the head which may contain a dozen shelled juveniles and many unshelled juveniles in different embryonic stages."

Distribution 
Distribution of Stenomelania denisoniensis is endemic to Australia and includes New South Wales and Queensland, the Northern Territory and Western Australia Is found most commonly found in tropical and subtropical Australia (the northern half of the continent).

References

 Brot, A. 1877. Die Melaniaceen (Melanidae). pp. 193–352 in Küster, H.C., Martini, F.W. & Chemnitz, J.H. (eds). Systematisches Conchylien-Cabinet. Nürnberg : Bauer & Raspe Bd 9 Tl 3.
 Iredale, T. 1943. A basic list of the freshwater Mollusca of Australia. The Australian Zoologist 10(2): 188-230
 Smith, B.J. 1992. Non-Marine Mollusca. In, Houston, W.W.K. (ed.). Zoological Catalogue of Australia. Non-marine Mollusca. Canberra : Australian Government Publishing Service Vol. 8 xii 408 pp.
 Glaubrecht, M., Brinkmann, N. & Pöppe, J. 2009. Diversity and disparity ‘down under’: Systematics, biogeography and reproductive modes of the ‘marsupial’ freshwater Thiaridae (Caenogastropoda, Cerithioidea) in Australia. Zoosystematics and Evolution 85(2): 199-275

External links 

Thiaridae
Gastropods of Australia
Gastropods described in 1877
Freshwater molluscs of Oceania